Pleckstrin homology domain-containing family B member 2 is a protein that in humans is encoded by the PLEKHB2 gene.

References

Further reading